Carlette Ewell (born 20 August 1971, Winston-Salem, North Carolina, United States) is an American professional boxer.

Ewell has won 5 professional boxing titles in her career, including the WIBA World light heavyweight title against Boxrec number 1 heavyweight Gwendolyn O'Neil. The biggest fight of her career was against Alejandra Jimenez for the WBC World female heavyweight title in Mexico. Ewell lost the bout in the first round by TKO with the occurrence of a crushed right ankle Fibula bone per her fall before being grazed with a punch

Professional Boxing Titles
WBE female light heavyweight title (180½ Ibs)
Universal Boxing Council
UBC America's female cruiserweight title (188½ Ibs)
Women's International Boxing Council
WIBC light heavyweight title (174 Ibs)
Women's International Boxing Association
WIBA World light heavyweight title (174 Ibs)
UNBC female heavyweight title (215 Ibs)

Boxing Record

References

External links
Carlette Ewell Awakening Fighters Profile

1971 births
Living people
Heavyweight boxers
American women boxers
21st-century American women